This article presents the discography of bluegrass band The Country Gentlemen.

Studio albums
 Country Songs, Old and New (Folkways, 1960, Smithsonian Folkways, 1991)
 Folk Songs & Bluegrass (Folkways, 1961, Smithsonian Folkways, 1991)
 Bluegrass at Carnegie Hall (Starday, 1962)
 Hootenanny (Design, 1963)
 Folk Session Inside (Mercury, 1963)
 Bringing Mary Home (Rebel, 1966)
 Traveler And Other Favorites (Rebel, 1968)
 Play It Like It Is (Rebel, 1969)
 New Look, New Sound (Rebel, 1970)
 One Wide River To Cross (Rebel, 1971)
 Sound Off (Rebel, 1971)
 The Award Winning Country Gentlemen (Rebel, 1972)
 The Country Gentlemen  (Vanguard, 1973)
 Remembrances & Forecasts (Vanguard, 1974)
 Joe's Last Train (Rebel, 1976)
 Calling My Children Home (Rebel, 1978)
 Sit Down, Young Stranger (Sugar Hill, 1980)
 River Bottom (Sugar Hill, 1981)
 Good As Gold (Sugar Hill, 1983)
 Return Engagement (Rebel, 1988)
 Classic Country Gents Reunion (Sugar Hill, 1989)
 Nashville Jail (Mercury, 1963, unreleased; Copper Creek, 1990)
 Let The Light Shine Down (Rebel, 1991)
 New Horizon (Rebel, 1992)
 Souvenirs (Rebel, 1995)
 Crying In the Chapel (Freeland, 2001)
 45 Years of Memories (Pinecastle, 2002)
 Songs Of The American Spirit (Pinecastle, 2004)

Live albums
 On the Road (Folkways, 1963, Smithsonian Folkways, 2001)
 Live From The Stage Of The Roanoake Bluegrass Festival (1967)
 Live In Japan (Seven Seas, 1970)
 Going Back To The Blue Ridge Mountains (Folkways, 1973)

Compilation albums
 The Best of the Early Country Gentlemen (1971)
 Yesterday & Today Volume 1 (Rebel, 1973)
 Yesterday & Today Volume 2 (Rebel, 1973)
 Yesterday & Today Volume 3 (Rebel, 1974)
 25 Years (Rebel, 1980)
 The Country Gentlemen feat. Ricky Skaggs (Vanguard, 1987)
 Sugar Hill Collection (Sugar Hill, 1995)
 Early Rebel Recordings: 1962-1971 {Box Set} (Rebel, 1998)
 High Lonesome (Starday, 1998)
 Complete Vanguard Recordings (Vanguard, 2002)

Chronological discography
 Country Songs, Old and New (Folkways, 1960, Smithsonian Folkways, 1991)
 Folk Songs & Bluegrass (Folkways, 1961)
 Bluegrass at Carnegie Hall (Starday, 1962)
 On the Road (Folkways, 1963, Smithsonian Folkways, 2001)
 Hootenanny (Design, 1963)
 Folk Session Inside (Mercury, 1963)
 Bringing Mary Home (Rebel, 1966)
 Live From The Stage Of The Roanoake Bluegrass Festival (1967)
 Traveler And Other Favorites (Rebel, 1968)
 Play It Like It Is (Rebel, 1969)
 New Look, New Sound (Rebel, 1970)
 Live In Japan (Seven Seas, 1970)
 The Best of the Early Country Gentlemen (1971)
 One Wide River To Cross (Rebel, 1971)
 Sound Off (Rebel, 1971)
 The Award Winning Country Gentlemen (Rebel, 1972)
 Going Back To The Blue Ridge Mountains (Folkways, 1973)
 The Country Gentlemen (Vanguard, 1973)
 Yesterday & Today Volume 1 (Rebel, 1973)
 Yesterday & Today Volume 2 (Rebel, 1973)
 Yesterday & Today Volume 3 (Rebel, 1974)
 Remembrances & Forecasts (Vanguard, 1974)
 Joe's Last Train (Rebel, 1976)
 Calling My Children Home (Rebel, 1978)
 25 Years (Rebel, 1980)
 Sit Down, Young Stranger (Sugar Hill, 1980)
 River Bottom (Sugar Hill, 1981)
 Good As Gold (Sugar Hill, 1983)
 The Country Gentlemen feat. Ricky Skaggs (Vanguard, 1987)
 Return Engagement (Rebel, 1988)
 Classic Country Gents Reunion (Sugar Hill, 1989)
 Nashville Jail (Copper Creek, 1990)
 Let The Light Shine Down (Rebel, 1991)
 New Horizon (Rebel, 1992)
 Sugar Hill Collection (Sugar Hill, 1995)
 Souvenirs (Rebel, 1995)
 Early Rebel Recordings: 1962-1971 {Box Set} (Rebel, 1998)
 High Lonesome (Starday, 1998)
 Crying In the Chapel (Freeland, 2001)
 Complete Vanguard Recordings (Vanguard, 2002)
 45 Years of Memories (Pinecastle, 2002)
 Songs Of The American Spirit (Pinecastle, 2004)

References

Discographies of American artists
Discography